Raymond is a city in Black Hawk County, Iowa, United States. The population was 759 at the time of the 2020 census. It is part of the Waterloo–Cedar Falls Metropolitan Statistical Area.

History
Raymond was platted in 1867. It was a shipping point on the Illinois Central Railroad.

Geography
Raymond is located at  (42.468381, -92.221178).

Demographics

2010 census
As of the census of 2010, there were 788 people, 313 households, and 238 families living in the city. The racial makeup of the city was 97.1% White, 0.9% African American, 0.5% Asian, 0.1% Pacific Islander, 0.5% from other races, and 0.9% from two or more races. Hispanic or Latino of any race were 1.0% of the population.

There were 313 households, of which 32.9% had children under the age of 18 living with them, 67.4% were married couples living together, 5.1% had a female householder with no husband present, 3.5% had a male householder with no wife present, and 24.0% were non-families. 20.8% of all households were made up of individuals, and 7.4% had someone living alone who was 65 years of age or older. The average household size was 2.52 and the average family size was 2.91.

The median age in the city was 40.4 years. 23.1% of residents were under the age of 18; 6.3% were between the ages of 18 and 24; 27.9% were from 25 to 44; 29.4% were from 45 to 64; and 13.3% were 65 years of age or older. The gender makeup of the city was 49.1% male and 50.9% female.

2000 census
As of the census of 2000, there were 537 people, 204 households, and 161 families living in the city. The racial makeup of the city was 98.51% White, 0.56% from other races, and 0.93% from two or more races. Hispanic or Latino of any race were 1.68% of the population.

There were 204 households, out of which 33.8% had children under the age of 18 living with them, 69.1% were married couples living together, 7.4% had a female householder with no husband present, and 20.6% were non-families. 18.1% of all households were made up of individuals, and 6.9% had someone living alone who was 65 years of age or older. The average household size was 2.63 and the average family size was 2.98.

26.4% are under the age of 18, 5.4% from 18 to 24, 28.5% from 25 to 44, 26.6% from 45 to 64, and 13.0% who were 65 years of age or older. The median age was 38 years. For every 100 females, there were 96.0 males. For every 100 females age 18 and over, there were 93.6 males.

The median income for a household in the city was $47,813, and the median income for a family was $55,417. Males had a median income of $39,306 versus $25,192 for females. The per capita income for the city was $22,201. About 3.3% of families and 3.6% of the population were below the poverty line, including 8.1% of those under age 18 and none of those age 65 or over.

Education
Raymond is within the Waterloo Community School District.

See also

William Waterfield House is on the National Register of Historic Places listings in Black Hawk County, Iowa.

References

External links 

City Data Comprehensive Statistical Data and more about Raymond

Cities in Black Hawk County, Iowa
Cities in Iowa
Waterloo – Cedar Falls metropolitan area
1866 establishments in Iowa